Meyler de Bermingham (d. before 1275) was an Anglo-Irish lord, founder of Athenry.

Ancestry
Meyler was a great-grandson of Robert de Bermingham who is said to have obtained a grant of Offaly from Strongbow or Henry II about 1172. Robert's son (Meyler, killed 1211) and grandson (Peter, died 1254) were both described as of Tethmoy, which is thought to have been the baronies of Warrenstown and part of Coolestown. Peter de Bermingham had sons James, Andrew, Maurice and Meyler.

Athenry

Peter and Meyler participated in the Norman invasion of Connacht in the 1230s, Peter obtaining Dunmore in County Galway and Tireragh in County Sligo.

Meyler himself made a separate settlement in an area called Clann Taidg, and founded a castle by the River Clarin at a ford called Áth na Rí (ford of the kings, or kingdoms). This became the town of Athenry.

Family
Meyler married Basilia de Worcester of County Tipperary, and had issue Peter (d. 1309?), Basilia de Bermingham, and William (Archbishop of Tuam, died 1309). Two of the latter's sons, Will Finn de Bermingham and Simon de Bermingham, were killed with their cousin John de Bermingham, 1st Earl of Louth during the Bragenstown Massacre in 1329.

Peter de Bermingham survived Meyler till as late as 1309, and had issue, Meyler (died 1302) and Rickard de Bermingham, who defeated King Fedlim of Connacht at the Second Battle of Athenry. Rickard's eldest son, John, was also killed at Bragenstown but was succeeded by his brother, Thomas de Bermingham.

Descendants
Meyler's senior descendants ceased with the death of Thomas, 19th Lord Athenry, in 1799, but the name is still common in Galway via junior branches. Among his descendants were philosopher Francis Bermingham and astronomer John Birmingham.

Select genealogy

Available evidence indicates that Myler's ancestor could have been one Richard, alive in 1066 and recorded as holding four hides of land at Birmingham as a Knight-service in 1086 for William fitz Ansculf. The descent is uncertain; the family may have been descendants of fitz Ansculf via the Pagnall family. The following family tree is based on their presumed descent from Richard of Birmingham (fl. 1066–1086). If true, it may indicate the family to be of English rather than Norman origin.

  Richard, alive 1066–1086
  |
  |
  William de Birmingham, fl. 1100–1135
  |
  |
  Peter de Birmingham, fl. 1154–1166.
  |
  |
  William, fl. 1172–1189.
  |
  |_
  |                       |
  |                       |
  Peter, fl. 1213/1215 Robert of Tethmoy, fl. 1172.
  |                       |
  |                       |
  William, fl. 1250.      Myler of Tethmoy, died 1211
  |                       |
  |                       |
  William, d. 1265.       Peter of Tethmoy, d. 1254
  |                       |
  |                       |_ William de Worchester, fl. 1230.
  William, fl. 1283–97    |      |       |        |       |
  |                       |      |       |        |       |
  |                       James Andrew Maurice Myler = Basilia de Worchester
  William, fl. 1305                                     |
  |                                                     |__
  |                                                     |              |                      |
  William, fl. 1325                                     |              |                      |
  |                                                     Peter Basilia William de Bermingham
  |__                              =Ni Cellaigh?  =Jordan de Exeter d. 1309
  |                     |                               |              |                      |
  |                     |                               |              |                      |
  Fulk, fl. 1340–67 William Rickard Jordan Oge Simon
  |                     |                               d. 1322 d.1319 d. 1329.
  |         |                               |
  |           |      William                            |
  |           |    fl. 1441–79 Thomas, d. 1375
  John Thomas       |                               |
  fl. 1397              |                               |
                 William, fl. 1449 Walter, d.1428
                        |                               |
                        |                               |
                Edward, d. 1538 Thomas, d.1473.

See also
 De Birmingham family

References
 History of Galway, James Hardiman, Galway, 1820
 The Abbey of Athenry, Martin J. Blake, Journal of the Galway Archaeological and Historical Society, volume II, part ii, 1902
 The Birmingham family of Athenry, H. T. Knox, J.G.A.H.S., volume ten, numbers iii and iv, 1916–17.
 The Birmingham chalice, J. Rabbitte, J.G.A.H.S., volume 17, i and ii, 1936-27
 The Second Battle of Athenry, Adrian James Martyn, East Galway News & Views, September 2008 – April 2009

External links
 Medieval Ireland: an encyclopedia
 Edenderry Historical Society
 The Fitzgeralds: Barons of Offaly

People from County Galway
13th-century Irish people
Irish soldiers
Meyler
Norman warriors
Normans in Ireland
People from Athenry
Barons Athenry